The 2018–19 Melbourne Renegades season is the eighth in the club's history. Coached by Andrew McDonald and captained by Aaron Finch, they competed in the BBL's 2018–19 season and they ended up winning the title.

Fixtures

Regular season

Match 2

Match 6

Match 12

Match 16

Match 18

Match 23

Match 26

Match 29

Match 32

Match 35

Match 38

Match 43

Match 46

Match 52

Knockout phase

Semi-final

Final

Ladder

Squad information
The following is the Renegades men squad for the 2018–19 Big Bash League season as of 28 December 2018.

Season statistics

Home attendance

References

External links
 Official website of the Melbourne Renegades
 Official website of the Big Bash League

Melbourne Renegades seasons